"Limousine" is a song by German synthpop band Hubert Kah, released in 1986 as the lead single from their third studio album Tensongs.

Background
Following the release of their third studio album Goldene Zeiten in 1984, Hubert Kah began writing and recording their first English studio album Tensongs. As recording neared completion, the band felt the album lacked any potential singles, prompting them to write "Limousine". The song was written in approximately 20 minutes at Löhr's apartment in Frankfurt.

Hirschburger recalled to James Arena in 2017: ""Limousine" was done very spontaneously. Hubert and I had an idea about a limousine. It worked, and we incorporated a classical approach in the melody." In a 1986 for Japanese TV, Hirschburger described "Limousine" as being "about a man who is real paranoid and is always chased by a dream".

The song achieved success in Europe, reaching No. 8 in Germany and No. 25 in Switzerland. It was the band's last Top 30 hit in Germany.

Promotion
For German TV, Hubert Kah also performed the song on P. I. T. – Peter-Illmann-Treff on 14 May, Formel Eins on 20 May, WWF Club on 13 June, and Peter's Pop Show on 6 December.

Critical reception
Upon its release, Music & Media described "Limousine" as Hubert Kah's "most commercial effort as of yet". They added: "Accessible and danceable pop disco plus a catchy chorus effectively backed by a female choir." Billboard described the song as "Eurosynth atmospherics in a Talk Talk/Roxy Music vein". Bob Eborall of the Ealing Leader described the song as a "potent single". David Quantick of New Musical Express described "Limousine" as a "completely commonplace single" and concluded that "Hubert's wheels are definitely not on fire".

Track listing
7" single
"Limousine" - 3:41
"Drowning" - 3:45

12" single (European release)
"Limousine" (Extended Version) - 5:40
"Drowning" - 3:45

12" single (UK release)
"Limousine" (American Remix) - 7:10
"Limousine" (Extended Version) - 5:40
"Drowning" - 3:45

12" single (German release)
"Limousine" (American Edit) - 5:13
"Drowning" - 3:45
"The Picture" - 3:24

12" single (Japanese release)
"Limousine" (American Remix Version) - 5:13
"Drowning" - 3:45

12" single (US promo)
"Limousine" (American Re-mix) - 7:10
"Limousine" (Extended Version - European) - 5:40
"Limousine" (Edit) - 3:41
"Drowning" - 3:45

Personnel
Hubert Kah
 Hubert Kemmler – vocals, arranger
 Markus Löhr – guitar, keyboards, arranger
 Klaus Hirschburger – bass, arranger

Additional musicians
 Lothar Krell – keyboards, arranger on "Limousine"  
 Curt Cress – drums
 Judy Cheeks, Victoria Miles, Patricia Shockley – backing vocals on "Limousine"

Production
 Michael Cretu,  – producers, arranger
 Boris Granich, Christer Modig – American remix

Other
 Mike Schmidt at Ink Studios – cover
 Dieter Eikelpoth – photography

Charts

References

1986 songs
1986 singles
Curb Records singles
Song recordings produced by Michael Cretu